The 2004 Texas Longhorns baseball team represented the University of Texas at Austin in the 2004 NCAA Division I baseball season. The Longhorns played their home games at Disch–Falk Field. The team was coached by Augie Garrido in his 8th season at Texas.

The Longhorns reached the College World Series final, falling in two games to champion Cal State Fullerton.

Roster

Schedule 

! style="background:#BF5700;color:white;"| Regular Season
|- valign="top" 

|- align="center" bgcolor="#ccffcc"
| Jan 30 || @  || Les Murakami Stadium • Honolulu, HI || 7–4 || 1–0 || 
|- align="center" bgcolor="#ccffcc"
| Jan 31 || @ Hawaii || Les Murakami Stadium • Honolulu, HI || 13–9 (11) || 2–0 || 
|- align="center" bgcolor="#ccffcc"
| Feb 1 || @ Hawaii || Les Murakami Stadium • Honolulu, HI || 10–1 || 3–0 || 
|- align="center" bgcolor="#ccffcc"
| Feb 6 ||  || Disch–Falk Field • Austin, TX || 9–0 || 4–0 || 
|- align="center" bgcolor="#ccffcc"
| Feb 7 || San Diego || Disch–Falk Field • Austin, TX || 4–3 || 5–0 || 
|- align="center" bgcolor="#ccffcc"
| Feb 8 || San Diego || Disch–Falk Field • Austin, TX || 6–5 (10) || 6–0 || 
|- align="center" bgcolor="#ccffcc"
| Feb 13 || vs. #30  || Minute Maid Park • Houston, TX (Minute Maid Park College Classic) || 6–0 || 7–0 || 
|- align="center" bgcolor="#ccffcc"
| Feb 14 || vs.  || Minute Maid Park • Houston, TX  (Minute Maid Park College Classic) || 6–3 || 8–0 || 
|- align="center" bgcolor="#ccffcc"
| Feb 15 || vs.  || Minute Maid Park • Houston, TX (Minute Maid Park College Classic) || 6–5 || 9–0 || 
|- align="center" bgcolor="#ccffcc"
| Feb 17 ||  || Disch–Falk Field • Austin, TX || 4–1 || 10–0 || 
|- align="center" bgcolor="#ffbbb"
| Feb 20 || @ #6  || Sunken Diamond • Stanford, CA || 4–7 || 10–1 || 
|- align="center" bgcolor="#ccffcc"
| Feb 21 || @ #6 Stanford || Sunken Diamond • Stanford, CA || 9–6 || 11–1 || 
|- align="center" bgcolor="#ffbbb"
| Feb 22 || @ #6 Stanford || Sunken Diamond • Stanford, CA || 1–8 || 11–2 || 
|- align="center" bgcolor="#ccffcc"
| Feb 25 ||  || Disch–Falk Field • Austin, TX || 8–2 || 12–2 || 
|- align="center" bgcolor="#ccffcc"
| Feb 27 ||  || Disch–Falk Field • Austin, TX || 6–0 || 13–2 || 
|- align="center" bgcolor="#ccffcc"
| Feb 28 || San Diego State || Disch–Falk Field • Austin, TX || 3–2 (10) || 14–2 || 
|- align="center" bgcolor="#ccffcc"
| Feb 29 || San Diego State || Disch–Falk Field • Austin, TX || 9–0 || 15–2 || 
|-

|- align="center" bgcolor="#ccffcc"
| Mar 2 || #4  || Disch–Falk Field • Austin, TX || 8–7 || 16–2 || 
|- align="center" bgcolor="#ccffcc"
| Mar 5 || #27 Cal State Fullerton || Disch–Falk Field • Austin, TX || 6–2 || 17–2 || 
|- align="center" bgcolor="#ccffcc"
| Mar 6 ||  || Disch–Falk Field • Austin, TX || 11–8 || 18–2 || 
|- align="center" bgcolor="#ccffcc"
| Mar 7 || #27 Cal State Fullerton || Disch–Falk Field • Austin, TX || 3–1 || 19–2 || 
|- align="center" bgcolor="#ccffcc"
| Mar 9 || @ #6 Rice || Reckling Park • Houston, TX || 5–0 || 20–2 || 
|- align="center" bgcolor="#ccffcc"
| Mar 12 ||  || Disch–Falk Field • Austin, TX || 3–2 || 21–2 || 
|- align="center" bgcolor="#ccffcc"
| Mar 13 || Eastern Michigan || Disch–Falk Field • Austin, TX || 7–0 || 22–2 || 
|- align="center" bgcolor="#ccffcc"
| Mar 14 || Eastern Michigan || Disch–Falk Field • Austin, TX || 8–3 || 23–2 || 
|- align="center" bgcolor="#ccffcc"
| Mar 16 || @  || Roadrunner Field • San Antonio, TX || 4–2 || 24–2 || 
|- align="center" bgcolor="#ccffcc"
| Mar 19 || @  || L. Dale Mitchell Baseball Park • Norman, OK || 3–1 || 25–2 || 1–0
|- align="center" bgcolor="#ffbbb"
| Mar 20 || @ Oklahoma || L. Dale Mitchell Baseball Park • Norman, OK || 2–3 || 25–3 || 1–1
|- align="center" bgcolor="#ccffcc"
| Mar 21 || @ Oklahoma || L. Dale Mitchell Baseball Park • Norman, OK || 5–4 || 26–3 || 2–1
|- align="center" bgcolor="#ccffcc"
| Mar 26 ||  || Disch–Falk Field • Austin, TX || 8–4 || 27–3 || 3–1
|- align="center" bgcolor="#ffbbb"
| Mar 27 || Oklahoma State || Disch–Falk Field • Austin, TX || 2–3 (10) || 27–4 || 3–2
|- align="center" bgcolor="#ccffcc"
| Mar 28 || Oklahoma State || Disch–Falk Field • Austin, TX || 11–3 || 28–4 || 4–2
|- align="center" bgcolor="#ccffcc"
| Mar 30 ||  || Disch–Falk Field • Austin, TX || 10–1 || 29–4 || 
|-

|- align="center" bgcolor="#ccffcc"
| Apr 3 || @  || Dan Law Field • Lubbock, TX || 4–0 || 30–4 || 5–2
|- align="center" bgcolor="#ccffcc"
| Apr 3 || @ Texas Tech || Dan Law Field • Lubbock, TX || 10–0 || 31–4 || 6–2
|- align="center" bgcolor="#ccffcc"
| Apr 6 ||  || Disch–Falk Field • Austin, TX || 4–2 || 32–4 || 
|- align="center" bgcolor="#ccffcc"
| Apr 9 || @  || Tointon Family Stadium • Manhattan, KS || 10–6 (20) || 33–4 || 7–2
|- align="center" bgcolor="#ccffcc"
| Apr 10 || @ Kansas State || Tointon Family Stadium • Manhattan, KS || 5–2 || 34–4 || 8–2
|- align="center" bgcolor="#ccffcc"
| Apr 11 || @ Kansas State || Tointon Family Stadium • Manhattan, KS || 4–1 || 35–4 || 9–2
|- align="center" bgcolor="#ccffcc"
| Apr 13 || #3  || Disch–Falk Field • Austin, TX || 3–2 || 36–4 || 
|- align="center" bgcolor="#ccffcc"
| Apr 16 || @  || Baylor Ballpark • Waco, TX || 7–6 || 37–4 || 10–2
|- align="center" bgcolor="#ffbbb"
| Apr 17 || Baylor || Disch–Falk Field • Austin, TX || 3–5 (10) || 37–5 || 10–3
|- align="center" bgcolor="#ccffcc"
| Apr 18 || Baylor || Disch–Falk Field • Austin, TX || 11–1 || 38–5 || 11–3
|- align="center" bgcolor="#ccffcc"
| Apr 20 ||  || Disch–Falk Field • Austin, TX || 9–3 || 39–5 || 
|- align="center" bgcolor="#ccffcc"
| Apr 23 || #20  || Disch–Falk Field • Austin, TX || 8–2 || 40–5 || 12–3
|- align="center" bgcolor="#ccffcc"
| Apr 24 || #20 Nebraska || Disch–Falk Field • Austin, TX || 4–2 || 41–5 || 13–3
|- align="center" bgcolor="#ffbbb"
| Apr 25 || #20 Nebraska || Disch–Falk Field • Austin, TX || 3–4 || 41–6 || 13–4
|- align="center" bgcolor="#ffbbb"
| Apr 30 || @ Missouri || Taylor Stadium • Columbia, MO || 1–4 || 41–7 || 13–5
|-

|- align="center" bgcolor="#ffbbb"
| May 1 || @ Missouri || Taylor Stadium • Columbia, MO || 0–8 || 41–8 || 13–6
|- align="center" bgcolor="#ccffcc"
| May 2 || @ Missouri || Taylor Stadium • Columbia, MO || 16–0 (7) || 42–8 || 14–6
|- align="center" bgcolor="#ccffcc"
| May 4 ||  || Disch–Falk Field • Austin, TX || 9–3 || 43–8 || 
|- align="center" bgcolor="#ccffcc"
| May 7 ||  || Disch–Falk Field • Austin, TX || 4–2 || 44–8 || 15–6
|- align="center" bgcolor="#ccffcc"
| May 8 || Kansas || Disch–Falk Field • Austin, TX || 6–5 || 45–8 || 16–6
|- align="center" bgcolor="#ccffcc"
| May 9 || Kansas || Disch–Falk Field • Austin, TX || 7–1 || 46–8 || 17–6
|- align="center" bgcolor="#ffbbb"
| May 15 ||  || Disch–Falk Field • Austin, TX || 0–2 || 46–9 || 
|- align="center" bgcolor="#ffbbb"
| May 15 || NC State || Disch–Falk Field • Austin, TX || 0–1 || 46–10 || 
|- align="center" bgcolor="#ccffcc"
| May 21 || #30  || Disch–Falk Field • Austin, TX || 6–3 || 47–10 || 18–6
|- align="center" bgcolor="#ccffcc"
| May 22 || #30 Texas A&M || Disch–Falk Field • Austin, TX || 12–9 || 48–10 || 19–6
|- align="center" bgcolor="#ffbbb"
| May 23 || #30 Texas A&M || Disch–Falk Field • Austin, TX || 1–7 || 48–11 || 20–6
|-

|-
! style="background:#BF5700;color:white;"| Post-Season
|-

|- align="center" bgcolor="#ffbbb"
| May 26 || (8)  || Ameriquest Field in Arlington • Arlington, TX || 2–5 || 48–12 || 0–1
|- align="center" bgcolor="#ccffcc"
| May 27 || #29 (5)  || Ameriquest Field in Arlington • Arlington, TX || 13–6 || 49–12 || 1–1
|- align="center" bgcolor="#ccffcc"
| May 28 || (8) Nebraska || Ameriquest Field in Arlington • Arlington, TX || 6–5 || 50–12 || 2–1
|- align="center" bgcolor="#ffbbb"
| May 29 || (4)  || Ameriquest Field in Arlington • Arlington, TX || 2–8 || 50–13 || 2–2
|-

|- align="center" bgcolor="#ccffcc"
| June 4 || (4)  || Disch–Falk Field • Austin, TX || 10–3 || 51–13 || 1–0
|- align="center" bgcolor="#ccffcc"
| June 5 || #15 (2)  || Disch–Falk Field • Austin, TX || 7–5 || 52–13 || 2–0
|- align="center" bgcolor="#ccffcc"
| June 6 || #15 (2) Oral Roberts || Disch–Falk Field • Austin, TX || 7–3 || 53–13 || 3–0
|-

|- align="center" bgcolor="#ccffcc"
| June 4 || #16  || Disch–Falk Field • Austin, TX || 15–3 || 54–13 || 4–0
|- align="center" bgcolor="#ccffcc"
| June 5 || #16 Vanderbilt || Disch–Falk Field • Austin, TX || 10–2 || 55–13 || 5–0
|-

|- align="center" bgcolor="#ccffcc"
| June 18 || #3 (8) Arkansas || Johnny Rosenblatt Stadium • Omaha, NE || 13–2 || 56–13 || 1–0
|- align="center" bgcolor="#ccffcc"
| June 20 || #5  || Johnny Rosenblatt Stadium • Omaha, NE || 9–3 || 57–13 || 2–0
|- align="center" bgcolor="#ccffcc"
| June 23 || #5 Georgia || Johnny Rosenblatt Stadium • Omaha, NE || 7–6 || 58–13 || 3–0
|- align="center" bgcolor="#ffbbb"
| June 26 || #4 Cal State Fullerton || Johnny Rosenblatt Stadium • Omaha, NE || 4–6 || 58–14 || 3–1
|- align="center" bgcolor="#ffbbb"
| June 27 || #4 Cal State Fullerton || Johnny Rosenblatt Stadium • Omaha, NE || 2–3 || 58–15 || 3–2
|-

References 

Texas Longhorns baseball seasons
Texas Longhorns
College World Series seasons
Big 12 Conference baseball champion seasons
Texas Longhorns baseball